Joni Lee Ryles (née Jenkins; born July 2, 1957) is an American country music singer. The daughter of Conway Twitty, she recorded several singles as Joni Penn. Her most successful solo single was "I'm Sorry Charlie", which peaked at number 16 on Hot Country Songs. The song was included on a self-titled album for MCA Records in 1976. Lee also sang with her father on "Touch the Hand" and "Don't Cry Joni" on his album The High Priest of Country Music, but she was not credited on the charts for either.

Ryles is the wife of country singer and session vocalist John Wesley Ryles.

Discography

Albums

Singles

Guest singles (uncredited)

References

External links
 
 Entry at 45cat.com
 Entry with Conway at 45cat.com

1957 births
American country singer-songwriters
American women country singers
Country musicians from Arkansas
Living people
Place of birth missing (living people)
MCA Records artists
Singer-songwriters from Arkansas
21st-century American women